Quyllurqucha (Quechua quyllur star qucha lake, "star lake", hispanicized spelling Coillorcocha, Goillorcocha, Qollurcocha) is a lake in Peru located in the Ancash Region, Corongo Province, La Pampa District, and in the Huaylas Province, Yuracmarca District. Quyllurqucha lies in the north of the Cordillera Blanca, at the foot of Champara, northwest of it.

It lies in the Yuraqmarca District, west of Champara.

References 

Lakes of Peru
Lakes of Ancash Region
Mountains of Peru
Mountains of Ancash Region